Anolis poei, the Telimbela anole, is a species of lizard in the family Dactyloidae. The species is found in Ecuador.

References

Anoles
Endemic fauna of Ecuador
Reptiles of Ecuador
Reptiles described in 2014
Taxa named by Omar Torres-Carvajal